PAP Community Foundation (abbreviation: PCF) is a charitable foundation in Singapore founded by the governing People's Action Party (PAP). Its aim includes the social and charitable causes between Singaporeans and the  PAP, especially in preschool education, eldercare and community services. It also includes offering financial assistance and promoting welfare of its citizens. Since 1986, the foundation has built many kindergartens and centres islandwide providing childcare, student care and aged care services. Centres are also built close to public housing estates, such that the centres are all within a close proximity. The incumbent Council Chairwoman is Minister for Communications and Information, Josephine Teo.

History

The PAP Community Foundation was founded as a charity organization with roots in Singaporean origins and society, the first chairperson of the board was former Prime Minister Goh Chok Tong between 1986 and 1990, followed by former President of Singapore Tony Tan and Coordinating Minister for National Security  Teo Chee Hean between 1990 and 1999, and 1999 and 2011 respectively. The foundation is headquartered in Upper Changi Road, Singapore. The mission statement state of the foundation is to "enhance the well-being of the community by providing quality educational services at affordable cost, as well as through welfare and community services". The organisation suggests a vision which will "nurture a multi-racial, fair, just and inclusive society by providing educational, welfare and community services." The group has grown to become a heartland centre, with approximately tens of thousands of children put through its centres in 87 locations.

Four notable purposes of PCF are Kindergarten, Child Care, Education, and Charity, with senior care proposed as the next series of implementations. The first senior care centre will be launched from 2014 onwards in Simei, as the first of 10 to 15 such centres it hopes to open in the next five years.

The official website for the organization states that the organization started in the 1960s to help prepare children for entry into primary schools. Classes were conducted in any space available - from 'wayang' stages to shop-houses. In addition to the benefits of having a pre-school education for children, the People's Action Party also viewed it as a social outreach programme to gain the support of parents From then till 1986, these kindergartens were run by individual party branches in their respective constituency.

Currently, the majority of pre-schoolers in Singapore attend one of the PCF-run kindergartens, and the PCF commands about half of Singapore's pre-school market. The foundation is also notable in offering a variety of bursaries and scholarships.

In 2021, PCF was recognised as the best workplace in Asia according to Great Place to Work given good workplace and employee support programmes despite the COVID-19 pandemic.

Minister of Finance Lawrence Wong was the Council Chairman from 2016 to 2022 as Lawrence Wong was slated to be Deputy Prime Minister of Singapore on 13 June. Josephine Teo took over the Council Chairwoman post since 2022.

References

External links 
Official site

1986 establishments in Singapore
Charities based in Singapore
Foundations based in Singapore
Organizations established in 1986
Socialism in Singapore